Moteur! is a studio album by the French progressive rock band Ange. It was released in 1981.

Track listing
Side One:
"Tant Pis L'indien"  – 03:48
"Saga"  – 05:08
"Rien N'est Trop Beau Pour Toi"  – 02:07
"Mourir, Souffrir"  – 03:35
"Touchez Pas À Mon Ciné"  – 05:09
Side Two:
"Détective Privé"  – 03:02
"Un Autre Jazz"  – 03:15
"Moi, Pas Idiot !"  – 04:10
"Assis !"  – 05:24
"Chatte, Chatte"  – 04:05

Personnel
 Lead Vocals, Pianos: Christian Decamps
 Keyboards, Backing Vocals: Francis Decamps
 Guitar: Robert Defer
 Bass, Backing Vocals: Didier Viseux
 Drums, Percussion: Jean-Pierre Guichard

References
Moteur! on ange-updlm (in French)
Moteur! on www.discogs.com

Ange albums
1981 albums